There have been two Duke Baronetcies; both are now extinct. The first was created on 16 July 1661 for Edward Duke in the Baronetage of England, and the second was created on 5 December 1848 for James Duke in the Baronetage of the United Kingdom.

Duke of Benhall, Suffolk (1661)
Sir Edward Duke, 1st Baronet (–1670). He was one of two MPs for Orford during the Short Parliament in 1640.
Sir John Duke, 2nd Baronet (3 January 1632 – 24 July 1705). Sir John was also MP for Orford, serving 1679–1685, 1689–1690 and 1697–1698.
 Sir Edward Duke, 3rd Baronet (c. 1694 – 25 August 1732). Sir Edward, like his predecessors in the title, served as MP for Orford (1721–1722).
Extinct on his death

Duke of London (1849)
Sir James Duke, 1st Baronet (31 January 1792 – 28 May 1873). Sir James was MP for Boston (1837–1849) and the City of London (1849–1865).
 Sir James Duke, 2nd Baronet (25 January 1865 – 3 July 1935).
Extinct on his death

References

1661 establishments in England
1849 establishments in the United Kingdom
Duke
Extinct baronetcies in the Baronetage of the United Kingdom